This is a list of rulers and office-holders in Burundi.

Heads of state 
Kings of Burundi
Presidents of Burundi
Vice-Presidents of Burundi

Heads of government 
Heads of government of Burundi

Colonial governors 
Provincial governors of Burundi
Colonial heads of Burundi
Colonial heads of Burundi (Urundi)
Colonial heads of Burundi (Ruanda-Urundi)

Secessionist movement 
Heads of state of Martyazo

See also 
Lists of office-holders

Burundi